The Tulsa Golden Hurricane softball team represents University of Tulsa in NCAA Division I college softball.  The team participates in the American Athletic Conference. The Golden Hurricane are currently led by head coach Crissy Strimple. The team plays its home games at Collins Family Softball Complex located on the university's campus.

History

Coaching history

Championships

Conference championships

Conference tournament championships

Coaching staff

Awards and honors

Conference awards
AAC Pitcher of the Year
Emily Watson, 2017

AAC Player of the Year
 Julia Hollingsworth, 2019

AAC Defensive Player of the Year
Rylie Spell, 2018

AAC Rookie of the Year
Chenise Delce, 2019

References

 
American Athletic Conference softball